Gulraiz Akhtar (2 February 1943 – 1 November 2021) was a Pakistani field hockey player. He was born in Rawalpindi, Pakistan to Muhammad Amin and Amina. Although his father was a lawyer by profession, Akhtar had a humble upbringing. He was fourth among seven siblings, three brothers and four sisters. Inspired by their uncle Muhammad Naseeb (1950), who was also an International Field Hockey player for Pakistan and Naseer Bunda, a neighbor and family friend who was also an Olympic Gold Medalist, all three brothers, Javed, Pervez and Gulraiz started playing field hockey regularly at a local playground in Rawalpindi. One of his elder brothers, Pervez Akhtar, also became an international player for Pakistan. However, Gulraiz Akhtar shone the most, becoming Pakistan's first Left-Half to score a goal. His career concluded with three gold medals in International Tournaments. He won his first gold medal at the 1968 Summer Olympics in Mexico City.

Gulraiz Akhtar served in Customs before attaining retirement age. He remained active in Hockey Events and sometimes wrote in renowned magazines and newspapers.

He died on 31 October 2021, in Lahore, aged 78. He was laid to rest in Lahore.

References

External links
 

1943 births
2021 deaths
Field hockey players from Rawalpindi
Pakistani male field hockey players
Olympic field hockey players of Pakistan
Olympic gold medalists for Pakistan
Olympic medalists in field hockey
Medalists at the 1968 Summer Olympics
Field hockey players at the 1968 Summer Olympics
Asian Games medalists in field hockey
Field hockey players at the 1970 Asian Games
Asian Games gold medalists for Pakistan
Medalists at the 1970 Asian Games